Egon Brecher (18 February 1880 – 12 August 1946) was an Austria-Hungary-born actor and director, who also served as the chief director of Vienna's Stadttheater, before entering the motion picture industry.

Early years
The son of a professor, Brecher began studying philosophy in 1900 at the University of Heidelberg in Germany. He did not finish his studies, deciding instead to become an actor.

Career 
He appeared on several provincial stages in Germany and Austria until 1910, and then played in Vienna on various occasions, directed by Josef Jarno until 1921.

In 1907, he founded an initiative (which lasted for one or two years) to play modern Yiddish theatre in German language with Siegfried Schmitz and members of the student club ‘Theodor Herzl’ like Hugo Zuckermann and Oskar Rosenfeld. In 1919 he was a co-founder, along with Isaak Deutsch, Jacob Mestel, and others, of the Freie Jüdische Volksbühne in Vienna, a Yiddish theatre, which existed until 1922.

In 1906 and 1911, he visited to New York to act in plays in that city's robust Yiddish Theatre. In 1921, he moved to New York to act on Broadway. In the latter half of the 1920s, he was stage director and leading man for the theatrical troupe headed by Eva Le Gallienne. He moved to Hollywood in the late 1920s to appear in foreign-language versions of American films. In the mid-1930s he appeared in classic horror films The Black Cat, Werewolf of London, The Black Room, Mark of the Vampire and The Devil-Doll, and worked steadily in the espionage films of the 1930s and 1940s, his Slavic accent landing him roles both noble and villainous. One of his largest screen roles was in 1946's So Dark the Night.

Death 
Brecher died on 12 August 1946, aged 66, of a heart attack in Hollywood, California. He is buried at Hollywood Forever Cemetery in Hollywood.

Selected filmography

The Spendthrift (1917)
Don Cesar, Count of Irun (1918) - Don Jose
The Royal Box (1929) - Count Toeroek
To the Last Man (1933) - Mark Hayden
Convention City (1933) - Zorb
As the Earth Turns (1934) - Mr. Janowski
No Greater Glory (1934) - Professor Racz
The Black Cat (1934) - The Majordomo
Many Happy Returns (1934) - Dr. Otto von Strudel
Now and Forever (1934) - Doctor (uncredited)
The Florentine Dagger (1935) - Karl
Black Fury (1935) - Alec Novak
Mark of the Vampire (1935) - Coroner (uncredited)
Air Hawks (1935) - Leon - Hideout Caretaker (uncredited)
Werewolf of London (1935) - Priest (uncredited)
The Awakening of Jim Burke (1935) - Mahler (uncredited)
The Black Room (1935) - Karl - Lead Villager (uncredited)
Here's to Romance (1935) - Descartes
Three Live Ghosts (1936) - German Officer (uncredited)
Charlie Chan's Secret (1936) - Ulrich
Paddy O'Day (1936) - Russian Musician (uncredited)
Boulder Dam (1936) - Pa Vangarick
Till We Meet Again (1936) - Schultz
Sins of Man (1936) - Doctor
The White Angel (1936) - Pastor Fliedner
The Devil-Doll (1936) - Detective (uncredited)
Anthony Adverse (1936) - Innkeeper (uncredited)
Alibi for Murder (1936) - Sir Conrad Stava
Ladies in Love (1936) - Concierge
Come and Get It (1936) - Mr. Schwerke (uncredited)
Love on the Run (1936) - Dr. Stefan Gorsay (uncredited)
One in a Million (1936) - Olympic Chairman (uncredited)
Black Legion (1937) - Old Man Dombrowski
Stolen Holiday (1937) - Deputy Bergery
The Great O'Malley (1937) - Morris - the Pawnbroker (uncredited)
Espionage (1937) - Chief of Police
Thin Ice (1937) - Janitor
I Met Him in Paris (1937) - Emile - Upper Sled Run Tower Control
The Emperor's Candlesticks (1937) - Czakova - Chief of Police (uncredited)
The Life of Emile Zola (1937) - Brucker (uncredited)
Love Under Fire (1937) - Civilian (uncredited)
The Women Men Marry (1937) - John (uncredited)
Lancer Spy (1937) - Bendiner (uncredited)
Heidi (1937) - Inn Keeper
Beg, Borrow or Steal (1937) - Antique Shop Proprietor (uncredited)
The Spy Ring (1938) - General A. R. Bowen
Blondes at Work (1938) - J.Z. Beckman (uncredited)
Arsène Lupin Returns (1938) - Vasseur (uncredited)
Invisible Enemy (1938) - Kirman
Cocoanut Grove (1938) - Pawnbroker (uncredited)
You and Me (1938) - Mr. Levins
Racket Busters (1938) - Peters (uncredited)
I'll Give a Million (1938) - Citizen
Gateway (1938) - Rabbi (uncredited)
Spawn of the North (1938) - Erickson (uncredited)
Suez (1938) - Doctor
Spring Madness (1938) - Soviet Travel Bureau Agent (uncredited)
Devil's Island (1939) - Debriac
The Three Musketeers (1939) - Landlord
Hotel Imperial (1939) - Pograncz (uncredited)
Juarez (1939) - Baron von Magnus (uncredited)
Confessions of a Nazi Spy (1939) - Fritz Muller - German Agent (uncredited)
Chasing Danger (1939) - Naval Doctor (uncredited)
The Angels Wash Their Faces (1939) - Mr. Smith
Nurse Edith Cavell (1939) - Dr. Gunther
Espionage Agent (1939) - Larsch
We Are Not Alone (1939) - Mr. Adolf Schiller (uncredited)
Judge Hardy and Son (1939) - Mr. Anton Volduzzi
Calling Philo Vance (1940) - Austrian Judge (uncredited)
Dr. Ehrlich's Magic Bullet (1940) - Martl (uncredited)
Rebecca (1940) - Hotel Desk Clerk (uncredited)
I Was an Adventuress (1940) - Jacques Dubois
Four Sons (1940) - Richter
All This, and Heaven Too (1940) - Doctor (uncredited)
The Man I Married (1940) - Czech
Knute Rockne All American (1940) - Elder in Norway (uncredited)
A Dispatch from Reuters (1940) - Von Konstat (uncredited)
Four Mothers (1941) - Music Foundation Director (uncredited)
They Dare Not Love (1941) - Prof. Keller
Man Hunt (1941) - Pawnbroker
Underground (1941) - Herr Director
Manpower (1941) - Pop Duval
All Through the Night (1942) - Art Gallery Watchman (uncredited)
Kings Row (1942) - Dr. Candell
Berlin Correspondent (1942) - Prisoner (uncredited)
Isle of Missing Men (1942) - Richard Heller
The Navy Comes Through (1942) - U-Boat Commander (uncredited)
Hitler's Children (1943) - Mr. Müller (uncredited)
Chetniks! The Fighting Guerrillas (1943) - Chetnik (uncredited)
The Purple V (1943) - Clerk (uncredited)
Mission to Moscow (1943) - Heinrich Sahm (uncredited)
They Came to Blow Up America (1943) - Kirschner (uncredited)
Above Suspicion (1943) - Gestapo Official (uncredited)
The Desert Song (1943) - French Colonel (uncredited)
The Hitler Gang (1944) - Landsberg Warden (uncredited)
The Hairy Ape (1944) - Refugee Violinist (uncredited)
The Seventh Cross (1944) - Sexton (uncredited)
U-Boat Prisoner (1944) - Prof. Van der Brek (uncredited)
They Live in Fear (1944) - Heinrich Graffen (uncredited)
A Royal Scandal (1945) - Wassilikow (uncredited)
White Pongo (1945) - Dr. Gerig
Cornered (1945) - Insurance Man (uncredited)
The Diary of a Chambermaid (1946) - The Postman (uncredited)
Just Before Dawn (1946) - Dr. Evans (uncredited)
The Wife of Monte Cristo (1946) - Proprietor
O.S.S. (1946) - Marcel Aubert
Sister Kenny (1946) - Frenchman (uncredited)
So Dark the Night (1946) - Dr. Boncourt
Temptation (1946) - Ibrahim (uncredited)
The Return of Monte Cristo (1946) - Island Doctor (uncredited) (final film role)

Literature
 Brigitte Dalinger: Verloschene Sterne. Geschichte des jüdischen Theaters in Wien. (History of Jewish theatre in Vienna) Picus Verlag, Wien 1998, pp. 65, 198

References

External links

 
 
 

1880 births
1946 deaths
20th-century American male actors
American male silent film actors
American male film actors
Austrian emigrants to the United States
Austrian male stage actors
Burials at Hollywood Forever Cemetery
Heidelberg University alumni
People from the Margraviate of Moravia